Destan Entertainment was a computer game developer from Poland established in 2003. It cooperated with Teyon, video games producer and online  publisher.

During its final years, it developed 3D and 2D render technology for both modern (Destan Engine 2.0) and older computers (Destan Engine 1.0). In addition to rendering technology, Destan focused on physics, sound, network and development tools.

It also worked with Teyon on a budget line of PC games. Destan Entertainment's games were published in Poland, Germany, Switzerland, Austria, UK, France, USA, Canada, Russia, Ukraine, India, Spain, Italy and other countries.

Games 
 2004 — Kids Games Line
 2005 — River Boat
 2005 — Frog Checkers
 2005 — Robot Rescue
 2005 — Robot Rescue 2
 2005 — Taxi Hawk
 2005 — Willy
 2005 — WR Rally
 2006 — Ball Fighter
 2006 — 1001 Minigolf Challenge
 2007 — Play Pets
 2007 — Burn
 2008 — Crystal Caverns
 2008 — Dynasty of Egypt
 2008 — Jewels of the Nile
 2008 — Battle Rage
 2009 — Hubert the Teddy Bear: Backyard Games
 2009 — Weekend Party: Fashion Show
 2009 — District Wars

External links
 Producer's official site
 Teyon Store site
 BURN official site
 BATTLE RAGE official site

Defunct video game companies of Poland
Video game development companies
Video game companies established in 2003
Polish companies established in 2003
Companies based in Kraków